Skuzzy may refer to:
Skuzzy (sternwheeler)
SCSI (Small Computer Systems Interface), pronounced Skuzzy